Super Smash Bros. (retroactively referred to as Super Smash Bros. 64 or simply Smash 64) is a 1999 crossover fighting video game developed by HAL Laboratory and published by Nintendo for the Nintendo 64. It was first released in Japan on January 21, 1999, in North America on April 26, 1999, and in Europe on November 19, 1999. The first installment in the Super Smash Bros. series, it is a crossover between several different Nintendo franchises, including Mario, The Legend of Zelda, Star Fox, Yoshi, Donkey Kong, Metroid, F-Zero, Mother, Kirby, and Pokémon. It presents a cast of characters and locations from these franchises and allows players to use each character's unique skills and the stage's hazards to inflict damage, recover health, and ultimately knock opponents off the stage.

Super Smash Bros. received mostly positive reviews upon its release. It was a commercial success, selling over five million copies worldwide by 2001, with 2.93 million sold in the United States and 1.97 million sold in Japan. It was given an Editors' Choice award from IGN for the "Best Fighting Game", and also became a Nintendo 64 Player's Choice title. The game spawned a series of sequels for each successive Nintendo console, starting with Super Smash Bros. Melee which was released for the GameCube in 2001.

Gameplay

The Super Smash Bros. series is a departure from the general genre of fighting games; instead of depleting an opponent's life bar, Smash Bros. players seek to knock opposing characters off a stage. Each player has a damage total, represented by a percentage, which rises as the damage is taken and can reach maximum damage of 999%. As this percentage rises, the character is knocked progressively farther by attacks. To knock out (KO) an opponent, the player must send that character flying off the edge of the stage, which is not an enclosed arena but rather an area with open boundaries. When knocked off the stage, a character may use jumping moves in an attempt to return; some characters have longer-ranged jumps and may have an easier time "recovering" than others. Additionally, characters have different weights, making it harder for heavier opponents to be knocked off the edge, but harder for them to recover once sent flying.

While games such as Street Fighter and Tekken require players to memorize complicated button-input combinations, Super Smash Bros. uses the same control combinations to access all moves for all characters. Characters are additionally not limited to only facing opponents, instead being allowed to move freely. The game focuses more on aerial and platforming skills than other fighting games, with larger, more dynamic stages rather than a simple flat platform. Smash Bros. also implements blocking and dodging mechanics. Grabbing and throwing other characters is also possible.

Various weapons and power-ups can be used in battle to inflict damage, recover health, or dispense additional items. They fall randomly onto the stage in the form of items from Nintendo franchises, such as Koopa shells, hammers, and Poké Balls. The nine multiplayer stages are locations taken from or in the style of Nintendo franchises, such as Planet Zebes from Metroid and Sector Z from Star Fox. Although stages are rendered in three dimensions, players move within a two-dimensional plane. Stages are dynamic, ranging from simple moving platforms to dramatic alterations of the entire stage. Each stage offers unique gameplay and strategic motives, making the chosen stage an additional factor in the fight.
 	
In the game's single-player mode, the player battles a series of computer-controlled opponents in a specific order, attempting to defeat them with a limited number of lives in a limited amount of time. While the player can determine the difficulty level and the number of lives, the series of opponents never changes. If the player loses all of their lives or runs out of time, they can continue at the cost of a loss of overall points. This mode is referred to as Classic Mode in later games. The single-player mode also includes two minigames, "Break the Targets" and "Board the Platforms", in which the objective is to break each target or board multiple special platforms, respectively. A "Training Mode" is also available in which players can manipulate the environment and experiment against computer opponents without the restrictions of a standard match.

Up to four people can play in multiplayer mode, which has specific rules predetermined by the players. Stock and timed matches are two of the multiplayer modes of play. This gives each player a certain number of lives or a selected time limit, before beginning the match with a countdown. Free-for-all or team battles are also a choice during matches using stock or time. A winner is declared once time runs out, or if all players except one or a team have lost all of their lives. A multiplayer game may also end in a tie if two or more players have the same score when the timer expires, which causes the match to end in sudden death. During sudden death, all fighters are given 300% damage and the last fighter standing will win the match.

Characters

The game includes twelve playable characters from popular Nintendo franchises. Characters have a symbol appearing behind their damage meter corresponding to the series to which they belong, such as a Triforce behind Link's and a Poké Ball behind Pikachu's. Furthermore, characters have recognizable moves derived from their original series, such as Samus's charged blasters and Link's arsenal of weapons. Eight characters are initially playable, and four additional characters can be unlocked by meeting specific criteria.

The character art featured on the game's box art and instruction manual is in the style of a comic book, and the characters are portrayed as toy dolls that come to life to fight. This style has since been omitted in later games, which feature trophies instead of dolls and in-game models rather than hand-drawn art.

Development

Super Smash Bros. was developed by HAL Laboratory, a Nintendo second-party developer, during 1998. Masahiro Sakurai was interested in making a fighting game for four players. He made a presentation of what was then called  to co-worker Satoru Iwata, who joined to help on the project. At this stage in development, the game was still using placeholder character models.  Sakurai understood that many fighting games did not sell well and that he had to think of a way to make his game original. His first idea was to include famous Nintendo characters and put them in a fight. Knowing that he would not get permission if he asked ahead of time, Sakurai made a prototype of the game without informing Nintendo, and did not show anyone until it was well-balanced. The prototype he presented featured Mario, Donkey Kong, Samus and Fox as playable characters.  The idea was later approved. Although never acknowledged by Nintendo or any developers behind Super Smash Bros., third-party sources have identified Namco's 1995 fighting game The Outfoxies as a possible inspiration, with Sakurai also crediting the idea of making a beginner-friendly fighting game to an experience in which he handily defeated a couple of casual gamers on The King of Fighters '95 in an arcade. On October 20, 2022, Sakurai, who still had the prototype of Dragon King: The Fighting Game, demonstrated its gameplay, and its differences from the final product of Super Smash Bros. Multiple planned characters were cut during development, including Marth, King Dedede, Bowser, and Mewtwo. All of these characters were added to later games.

Super Smash Bros. features music from some of Nintendo's popular gaming franchises. While many are newly arranged for the game, some pieces are taken directly from their sources. The music for Super Smash Bros. was composed by Hirokazu Ando, who later returned as sound and music director for Super Smash Bros. Melee. A complete soundtrack was released on CD in Japan through Teichiku Records in 2000.

To promote the game's launch, Nintendo of America staged an event called Slamfest '99, held at the MGM Grand Adventures Theme Park in Las Vegas, Nevada, on April 24, 1999. The event featured a real-life wrestling match between costumed performers dressed as Mario, Yoshi, Pikachu, and Donkey Kong, as well as stations set up for attendees to preview the game. The wrestling match was live-streamed on the web via RealPlayer, and was available to be re-watched for several months afterward via a downloadable file from the event's official website. Despite this, no video footage of Slamfest '99 is known to survive, and the broadcast is currently considered lost media.

Reception

Critically, Super Smash Bros. garnered generally positive reviews, with most of the praise going towards its multiplayer-player mode, music, "original" fighting game style, and simple learning curve. 
There were criticisms, however, such as the game's scoring being difficult to follow and the single-player mode's perceived difficulty and lack of features, with GameSpot former editorial director, Jeff Gerstmann, noting the single-player game "won't exactly last a long time". Super Smash Bros. was commercially successful, becoming a Nintendo 64 Player's Choice title, selling 1.97 million copies in Japan and 2.93 million in the United States as of 2008.

See also

The Outfoxies
Jump Super Stars

Notes

References

External links
 
 
 

Crossover video games
Crossover fighting games
HAL Laboratory games
IQue games
Nintendo 64 games
1999 video games
Fighting games
2.5D fighting games
Platform fighters
Video games about toys
Video games with 2.5D graphics
Super Smash Bros.
Virtual Console games for Wii
Multiplayer and single-player video games
Video games developed in Japan
Video games scored by Hirokazu Ando
Esports games
Video games directed by Masahiro Sakurai